This is a list of American television-related events in 1963.

Events

Other television events in 1963
The Federal Communications Commission approves authorization of television remote controls to be included with each manufactured television set.
For the first time, most Americans say that they get more of their news from television than newspapers.

Television programs

Debuts

Ending this year

Television stations

Sign-ons

Network affiliation changes

Station closures

Births

Deaths

References

External links
List of 1963 American television series at IMDb